This is a list of primate species by estimated global population.  This list is not comprehensive, as not all primates have had their numbers quantified.

See also

Lists of organisms by population
Lists of mammals by population
Human population
The World's 25 Most Endangered Primates

References

Mammals
primates
Population